Roccaguglielma is a medieval rocca fort which dominates the town of Esperia and once formed its historic town-centre. It is now also known as Esperia superiore (Upper Esperia).

Frazioni of the Province of Frosinone
Former municipalities of Lazio
Castles in Italy